Khubz mulawah, mulawah, or rashush is a Yemeni flatbread that is baked in a traditional tannur in Yemeni cuisine. A similar bread, malawach, has been brought to Israel by Yemenite Jews .

Khubz mulawah is often eaten for breakfast with ghee and honey on weekends.

Etymology
Both mulawah and Lahoh terms come from the Arabic root (l-w-ḥ) which means the thing that is flat.

See also
 Yemeni cuisine
 Arab cuisine
 Shafoot
 Fatoot
 Zhug

References

Yemeni cuisine
Puff pastry